The Assawoman Bay Bridge crosses the Assawoman Bay in Ocean City, Maryland.  The bridge carries Maryland Route 90, a freeway, into northern Ocean City, Maryland.  The bridge consists of two lanes and is undivided, but it is heavily travelled. In the summer, it is usually congested with traffic heading into and out of Ocean City, especially on Fridays and Sundays.  It ends in North Ocean City at Maryland Route 528 (Coastal Highway) and 62nd Street.

References

External links
Assawoman Bay Bridge map from Maryland Hometown Locator

Box girder bridges in the United States
Ocean City, Maryland
Road bridges in Maryland
Transportation buildings and structures in Worcester County, Maryland